Uruguay and its OTI member station Teledoce, was one of the founders and main launchers of the OTI Festival. The country debuted in the contest in the first show in Madrid in 1972. Since then, the Uruguayan broadcaster took part every year until the last show which was held in Acapulco in 2000.

History 
Uruguay debuted in the OTI Festival in 1972 with Ronayr Franco and his song "Busco mi destino" (I look for my destiny) created by the Spanish composer Augusto Algueró. Since their debut the Uruguayan trajectory in the OTI Festival was only moderate and only managed to reach the top 10 in five occasions. Although Teledoce was unable to win the contest, it achieved a significant result with Daniel Mantero and his song "Secreto enamorado" (A secret in love) which turned into a hit in the South American country. Since then, the Uruguayan TV channel never managed to reach again the top ten.

Contestants

References 

OTI Festival
Uruguayan music